Brian Finney is a British-American scholar of English literature. He has a BA (Hons) in English and Philosophy from the University of Reading and a PhD in English from Birkbeck College. He taught at the University of London until 1987, when he migrated to California. Since then, he has taught at the University of California, Riverside; the University of California, Los Angeles; the University of Southern California; and California State University, Long Beach.

He won the James Tait Black Award for his biography of Christopher Isherwood.

Bibliography
 Since How It Is: A Study of Samuel Beckett's Later Fiction.  London: Covent Garden P, 1972.
 Christopher Isherwood: A Critical Biography. London: Faber & Faber; New York: Oxford UP, 1979.
 The Inner I: British Literary Autobiography of the Twentieth Century.  London: Faber & Faber; New York: Oxford UP, 1985.
 D. H. Lawrence. Sons and Lovers: A Critical Study. Harmondsworth, Middlesex: Penguin; New York: Viking Penguin, 1990.
 English Fiction Since 1984: Narrating a Nation. London and New York: Palgrave  Macmillan, 2006.
 Martin Amis. Routledge Guides to Literature. London and New York: Routledge, 2008.
 Terrorized: How the War on Terror Affected American Culture and Society. Amazon: Kindle, 2011.
 Money Matters. A Novel. Amazon: KDP, 2019.
 Dangerous Conjectures. Amazon: KDP, 2021.

References

Living people
British biographers
Alumni of the University of Reading
Alumni of Birkbeck, University of London
Academics of the University of London
University of California, Riverside faculty
University of California, Los Angeles faculty
University of Southern California faculty
California State University, Long Beach faculty
Year of birth missing (living people)